Polystira jelskii is a species of sea snail, a marine gastropod mollusk in the family Turridae, the turrids.

Description

Distribution
This species occurs in the North Atlantic Ocean and the Caribbean Sea.

References

 Petuch, E. J. Neogene History of Tropical American Mollusks: Biogeography and Evolutionary Patterns of Tropical Western Atlantic Mollusks. p. 163; pl. 38; figs. 7, 8.

External links
  Todd J.A. & Rawlings T.A. (2014). A review of the Polystira clade — the Neotropic’s largest marine gastropod radiation (Neogastropoda: Conoidea: Turridae sensu stricto). Zootaxa. 3884(5): 445–491

jelskii
Gastropods described in 1865